This article summarizes the events, album releases, and album release dates in hip hop music for the year 1990.

Released albums

Highest-charting singles

See also

Last article: 1989 in hip hop music
Next article: 1991 in hip hop music

References

Hip hop
Hip hop music by year